The 2018 Swiss Indoors was a men's tennis tournament played on indoor hard courts. It was the 49th edition of the event, and part of the 500 series of the 2018 ATP World Tour. It was held at the St. Jakobshalle in Basel, Switzerland, from 22 October through 28 October 2018. First-seeded Roger Federer won the singles title.

Points and prize money

Point distribution

Singles main-draw entrants

Seeds

 Rankings are as of October 15, 2018

Other entrants
The following players received wildcards into the singles main draw:
  Taylor Fritz 
  Henri Laaksonen 
  Jack Sock

The following player received entry as a special exempt:
  Ernests Gulbis

The following players received entry from the qualifying draw:
  Marius Copil 
  Taro Daniel
  Laslo Đere  
  Alexei Popyrin

The following player received entry as a lucky loser:
  Dušan Lajović

Withdrawals
Before the tournament
  Juan Martín del Potro → replaced by  Maximilian Marterer
  David Goffin → replaced by  Ryan Harrison
  Stan Wawrinka → replaced by  Dušan Lajović

Doubles main-draw entrants

Seeds

 Rankings are as of October 15, 2018

Other entrants
The following pairs received wildcards into the doubles main draw:
  Marc-Andrea Hüsler /  Sem Verbeek
  Henri Laaksonen /  Luca Margaroli

The following pair received entry from the qualifying draw:
  Guillermo García López /  David Marrero

The following pair received entry as lucky losers:
  Robert Lindstedt /  Fabrice Martin

Withdrawals
Before the tournament
  Ivan Dodig

Finals

Singles

 Roger Federer defeated  Marius Copil, 7–6(7–5), 6–4

Doubles

  Dominic Inglot /  Franko Škugor defeated  Alexander Zverev /  Mischa Zverev, 6–2, 7–5

References

External links
Official website

2018 ATP World Tour
2018
2018 in Swiss tennis
October 2018 sports events in Switzerland